Harry Thornton may refer to:

Harry I. Thornton, US politician
Harry Thornton, character in Scarecrow and Mrs. King
Dick Thornton (American football), real name Harry Thornton, American football player
Harry Thornton, in 1873 High Sheriff of Bedfordshire

See also
Henry Thornton (disambiguation)
Harold Thornton, Australian painter